Jean Adams is an epidemiologist and Professor of Dietary Public Health at the MRC Epidemiology Unit based at the School of Clinical Medicine, University of Cambridge.

Education
Adams earned a MSc in 2007 at the City, University of London in Health Psychology;  in 2004, a Ph.D. at Newcastle University in Epidemiology and Public Health and a MBBS there in 2001 as well as a BMedSci in Health Psychology and Psychiatry in 1998.

Her doctorate was on the socio-economic inequalities of health, after which she completed a MRC Health of the Population fellowship and an NIHR Career Development Fellowship.

Career
While completing her fellowships, Adams was a lecturer at Newcastle University before moving to the MRC Epidemiology Unit in 2004 and CEDAR in 2014. She helped form the Dietary Public Health group, was appointed Programme Leader in the Population Health Interventions unit in 2020 and Professor in 2022.

References

External links
 Entry on Google Scholar
 ORCid listing

Living people
Year of birth missing (living people)
Alumni of City, University of London
Alumni of Newcastle University
British women epidemiologists
School of Clinical Medicine, University of Cambridge
Academics of the University of Cambridge
Medical Research Council (United Kingdom) people